The National Philharmonic of Ukraine, often referred to as Kyiv Philharmonic and National Philharmonic, is a complex of two adjacent concert halls in the Khrestchaty Park in Kyiv, Ukraine. Formerly the Merchant's House, the building's use for musical performances is associated with the Philharmonic Society, established by Mykola Lysenko.

The historic building was built at the end of the 19th century. Standing at the end of Khreschatyk street near the European Square, it has hosted numerous Russian composers such as Sergei Rachmaninoff, Alexander Scriabin, and Pyotr Ilyich Tchaikovsky and famous opera singers like Leonid Sobinov and Feodor Chaliapin.

History

The Merchant's House 

At the end of the nineteenth century, Kyiv, at the time the leading commercial center in the south-west of the Russian Empire, flourished in its cultural development. In 1881, the Council of Elders of the Kyiv Merchants Assembly acquired permission to establish a recreational area in the Tsarskaya (Tsar’s) Square (now the European Square) where a year later a brick building decorated with towers and metal eaves was erected by the famous Kyiv architect Vladimir Nikolayev and named the Merchants' House  (Merchants' Assembly). The building rapidly gained recognition among Kyiv residents and became the center for cultural gatherings where society held masquerade balls, science and political conferences, charitable lotteries, and literary evenings. Because of the building's good acoustics the Merchants' House became popular for musical performances.

The history of the Merchants' House has been greatly affected by the Ukrainian composer, pianist and conductor Mykola Lysenko. As one of the founders of the Philharmonic Society, Ukrainian Club, and Ukrainian School of Music, Lysenko was elected to the directorate board of the Merchants' House and brought the music of many Russian and European composers to the citizens of Kyiv.

After the Russian Revolution the building underwent a big change in its purpose and accommodated the Proletarian House of Arts, converted to the House of Political Education, and later to the Bolshevik Club and Republican Palace of Pioneers. The Merchant's Assembly ceased to exist in 1919. In 1927, the Philharmonic Society moved to Kharkiv when the city became the capital of the Ukrainian Soviet Socialist Republic. But in 1934 it returned to Kyiv when the city regained its status.

After the 1941 Nazi invasion, the Philharmonic Society stopped its work, and most of its priceless archives were destroyed. During the German occupation of Kyiv, the Society's building was converted to a German Officer's Club. This was one of the important reasons why the building was not destroyed, remaining one of the very few surviving pre-war buildings on Khreshchatyk street. Following the liberation of Kyiv, the Philharmonic Society building resumed its operation in 1944 as soon as hostilities moved away from Kyiv.

National Philharmonic 

In 1962, the building was renamed to Mykola Lysenko Kyiv State Philharmonic in honor of the composer's 120th birthday anniversary and the 50th anniversary of his death. It was also awarded the status of architectural monument. In the 1980s, the building suffered a flood, during which many of its music libraries and archives perished. The conditions demanded restoration, which began in 1995. A year later, the restored building opened its doors to the public.

In October 1994, the newly elected President of Ukraine, Leonid Kuchma, granted the building the status of National Philharmonic of Ukraine. In 2000, the National Philharmonic received a cultural grant from the Government of Japan with which it was able to acquire a new concert grand piano and additional musical instruments for its symphony orchestra, the Symphony Orchestra of the National Philharmonic of Ukraine.

Today, the Lysenko Colonnaded Hall of the Philharmonic remains one of the two most prestigious classical music stages in the city (along with the Kyiv Opera.) Director of the Philharmonic since 1996 - Volodymyr Lukashev

Academic Symphony Orchestra of the National Philharmonic of Ukraine 

The Symphony Orchestra of the National Philharmonic of Ukraine was found in September, 1995, under the leadership of Leonid Tykhonov. A year later in 1996 the young Mykola Dyadura took over. Since the concert season 2012–2013 Roman Kofman is the orchestra's chief conductor. Today the orchestra is acknowledged as one of the best ensembles in Eastern Europe.

See also
 All-Ukrainian National Congress
 Russian Musical Society

Notes and references

External links 
 Homepage of the National Philharmonic of Ukraine

 Official site
 Kyiv Sightseeing Guide (2001) .
 Сад Купеческого собрания - филармония, at oldkyiv.org.ua
 National Philharmonic of Ukraine (Kyiv)

Buildings and structures in Kyiv
Convention centers in Ukraine
Concert halls in Ukraine
Tourist attractions in Kyiv
1882 establishments in the Russian Empire
Music venues completed in 1882
Institutions with the title of National in Ukraine